The 1967 Copa Libertadores de América was the eighth edition of the Copa Libertadores, and which involved 20 club teams from South American nations.

The tournament was divided into three rounds; the first group stage, the second group stage, and the final. The tournament was won by Racing of Argentina who beat Nacional of Uruguay.

Qualified teams

First round
Nineteen teams were drawn into two groups of six and one group of seven. In each group, teams played against each other home-and-away. The top two teams in each group advanced to the Second round. Peñarol, the title holders, had a bye to the next round.

Group 1

Group 2

Group 3

Source:

Semifinals
There was one group of four teams and one of three. In each group, teams played against each other home-and-away. The top team in each group advanced to the Final.

Group 1

 Racing and Universitario finished level on points, and Racing won a play-off 2-1

Group 2

Finals

Goalscorers
The top goalscorer in the tournament was Norberto Raffo of Racing Club, who scored 14 goals.

References

1
Copa Libertadores seasons